The Kokdumalak gas field is a natural gas field located in the Qashqadaryo Province. It was discovered in 1956 and developed by and Uzbekneftegaz. It began production in 1960 and produces natural gas and condensates. The total proven reserves of the Kokdumalak gas field are around 12 trillion cubic feet (343 km3), and production is slated to be around 450 Million cubic feet/day (12.8×105m3) in 2013.

References

Natural gas fields in Uzbekistan
Natural gas fields in the Soviet Union